Steven L. Richmond (born December 11, 1959) is an American former professional ice hockey player. He played 159 games in the National Hockey League with four teams between 1984 and 1989.

Amateur career
Richmond grew up playing hockey in Chicago where he attended Evanston High School. He also played two years of Junior hockey in Pickering, Ontario. He finished his amateur career playing for the University of Michigan, where he holds the record for most goals by a defenseman with 40.

Professional career

Signed as a free agent by the New York Rangers in 1982, Richmond ended up playing 159 games in the National Hockey League with the New York Rangers, Detroit Red Wings, New Jersey Devils, and Los Angeles Kings. He was also a member of the Tulsa Oilers of the Central Hockey League (CHL) that suspended operations on February 16, 1984, playing only road games for the final six weeks of 1983–84 season. Despite this adversity, the team went on to win the league championship.

Post career
Richmond is currently the director of player development of the Washington Capitals. His son Danny Richmond is also a professional ice hockey player.

Career statistics

Regular season and playoffs

Awards
 Stanley Cup champion – 2018
 Adams Cup champion – 1984

References

External links
 

1959 births
Living people
Adirondack Red Wings players
American men's ice hockey defensemen
Detroit Red Wings players
Flint Spirits players
Ice hockey people from Chicago
Jewish ice hockey players
Los Angeles Kings players
Michigan Wolverines men's ice hockey players
New Haven Nighthawks players
New Jersey Devils players
New York Rangers players
San Diego Gulls (IHL) players
Tulsa Oilers (1964–1984) players
Utica Devils players
Undrafted National Hockey League players
Washington Capitals executives